Flores da Cunha is a municipality in the state of Rio Grande do Sul, Brazil.
It is the largest producer of wines inside Brazil. The Venetian language in its Brazilian form Talian is co-official with Portuguese in Flores da Cunha.

Climate
Because of the Altitude of 756 meters above the sea level, The Climate of Flores da Cunha is Oceanic Climate type Cfb. With warm (not hot) to cool summers with some few experiences of snowfall between July and August.

Gallery

See also
List of municipalities in Rio Grande do Sul

References

Municipalities in Rio Grande do Sul